MKS Znicz Basket Pruszków is a basketball club based in Pruszków, Poland. The team currently plays in the I Liga, the second highest division of basketball in Poland.

Honours

Sponsorship names
Throughout the years, due to sponsorship, the club has been known as:
Hoop Pekaes Pruszków (1998–2000)
MKS Blachy (2002)
Old Spice Pruszków (2002–2003)

Players

Notable players

 Oliver Miller
 Adam Wójcik
 Cezary Trybański

References

External links
Official website (in Polish)

Basketball teams in Poland
Basketball teams established in 1923